The Japanese Woman (German: Die Japanerin) is a 1919 German silent mystery film directed by Ewald André Dupont and starring Max Landa, Tzwetta Tzatschewa and Conrad Veidt.

The film's sets were designed by the Hungarian art director Eugen Stolzer.

Cast
 Max Landa as Detektiv 
 Conrad Veidt as The Secretary 
 Leopold von Ledebur as Robert Raymond 
 Helene Voß as Lieschen 
 Tzwetta Tzatschewa as Mau-Fo 
 Bernhard Goetzke as Arabischer Diener im Hause Raymonds 
 Ria Jende as Mary 
 Rose Lichtenstein as Stubenmädchen 
 Camilo Sacchetto as Henry Clavering 
 Marie Grimm-Einödshofer
 Karl Platen
 Loni Pyrmont

References

Bibliography
 John T. Soister. Conrad Veidt on Screen: A Comprehensive Illustrated Filmography. McFarland, 2002.

External links

1919 films
Films of the Weimar Republic
German silent feature films
Films directed by E. A. Dupont
German mystery films
1919 mystery films
German black-and-white films
Silent mystery films
1910s German films